Gilmore Township is a civil township of Isabella County in the U.S. state of Michigan. The population was 1,376 at the 2000 census.

History
Gilmore Township was organized in 1870.

Geography

Demographics
As of the census of 2000, there were 1,376 people, 511 households, and 400 families residing in the township. There were 742 housing units at an average density of 20.8 per square mile (8.0/km2). The racial makeup of the township was 96.37% White, 0.07% African American, 1.45% Native American, 0.15% Asian, 1.16% from other races, and 0.80% from two or more races. Hispanic or Latino of any race were 3.63% of the population.

There were 511 households, out of which 29.4% had children under the age of 18 living with them, 68.5% were married couples living together, 6.3% had a female householder with no husband present, and 21.7% were non-families. 16.0% of all households were made up of individuals, and 6.3% had someone living alone who was 65 years of age or older.  The average household size was 2.66 and the average family size was 2.91.

In the township the population was spread out, with 24.3% under the age of 18, 6.5% from 18 to 24, 28.1% from 25 to 44, 27.0% from 45 to 64, and 14.1% who were 65 years of age or older.  The median age was 40 years. For every 100 females, there were 100.0 males.  For every 100 females age 18 and over, there were 94.2 males.

The median income for a household in the township was $37,000, and the median income for a family was $39,911. Males had a median income of $30,179 versus $23,194 for females. The per capita income for the township was $16,277.  About 6.6% of families and 9.9% of the population were below the poverty line, including 13.4% of those under age 18 and 7.6% of those age 65 or over.

References

Notes

Sources

Townships in Isabella County, Michigan
1870 establishments in Michigan
Townships in Michigan